Louise de Kiriline Lawrence (née Flach; January 30, 1894 – April 27, 1992) was a naturalist, author, and nurse. She was a frequent contributor to the National Audubon Society magazine Audubon.

Early life
Louise de Kiriline Lawrence was born Louise Flach on January 30, 1894, in Svensksund, Vikbolandet, Sweden, to Hillevid Neergaard and Sixten Flach.  Her father Sixten was a trained naturalist.  He helped to establish the bird sanctuary on Stora Karlsö, an island west of Gotland.  Louise's early life was one of wealth and social connections.  Her godmother and namesake was Princess Louise of Denmark.  At the age of 18, she was presented at court to Gustav V of Sweden.

Visitors to the Flach estate included well-known Swedish naturalists, among them Bruno Liljefors.

Career
De Kiriline Lawrence trained as a nurse and was employed by the Danish Red Cross during World War I. One of her patients in a Denmark camp hospital was a Russian officer, Lt. Gleb Nikoleyevich Kirilin; they married in 1918. He returned to Russia to fight with the White Army in the Russian Civil War, and she followed him there in 1919.  After several weeks, the married couple was captured by the Red Army and separated.  Louise, after her release, visited Gleb in Moscow.  In June 1919, Gleb and other officers were transferred and Louise lost contact with him. Gleb Kirilin disappeared in Siberia where, according to accounts, he was executed. Keeping up hope that Gleb would be found, Louise worked as a nurse in Russia for several years while she searched for him, including work with European Student Relief.

In 1927 de Kiriline Lawrence emigrated to Canada and continued to work as a nurse, joining the outpost service of the Canadian Red Cross Society. Stationed in rural northern Ontario, she became well known as the nurse to the Dionne quintuplets during the first year of their lives.  For her work with the quints, she received a King George V Silver Jubilee Medal.

She retired from nursing in 1935, and lived in a cabin in Northern Ontario. She met Leonard Lawrence, a carpenter, and married him in 1939. By this time she had begun a new career as an ornithologist and nature writer.  Percy A. Taverner encouraged her to band birds; Doris Huestis Speirs and Margaret Morse Nice also served as mentors to de Kiriline Lawrence.  From 1948, she conducted a 15-year correspondence with Alexander Skutch, with whom she shared interests in natural history, field observation, and writing accessible to the general public.  W. Earl Godfrey of the National Museum of Canada was also an early mentor.  The pair corresponded from 1947 until at least 1959, exchanging information, observations, and specimens.  Godfrey acknowledged de Kiriline Lawrence's contributions in his field guide, The Birds of Canada (1966). She is recognized for her study of the red-eyed vireo, which identified the songbird as capable of producing 22,197 distinct calls in a single day. She published nearly twenty scientific papers in The Auk, The Wilson Bulletin, and The Canadian Field-Naturalist and more than 40 articles for Audubon and other popular magazines.  De Kiriline Lawrence carried out the majority of her scientific work on her property, located outside of North Bay, Ontario.

Working from the most northerly bird banding station in Ontario, de Kiriline Lawrence made significant contributions to the knowledge of the northern limits of many North American species, chief among them red crossbill, Loxia curvirostra.  Her observations and collecting constitute the earliest nest records for this species, as well as an early record of the L. c. bendirei subspecies for Ontario.

Later life and death
Louise de Kiriline Lawrence died on April 27, 1992, in North Bay, Ontario.

Legacy and recognition
In 1954, de Kiriline Lawrence became the first Canadian woman to be named an Elective Member of the American Ornithologists' Union.  She received an honorary LL.D. from Laurentian University in 1970.  In 2014, the Nipissing Naturalists Club established an annual Louise de Kiriline Lawrence Nature Festival.  In 2016, the Club, in partnership with Ontario Heritage Trust, placed a plaque in honor of Louise de Kiriline Lawrence, in Nipissing District.  Laurentian University awards five yearly scholarships named for de Kiriline Lawrence.

Works

 Illustrated by Thoreau MacDonald.  Reissued by Natural Heritage Books, 1988, .

 Illustrated by Glen Loates.  Reissued by McGraw-Hill Ryerson, 1968 and by Natural Heritage Books, 1987, .
  Reissued by Natural Heritage Books, 1986, .
 Published in Toronto by McGraw-Hill Ryerson, 1977.  Reissued by Natural Heritage Books, 1987, .
 Illustrated by Aletha Karstad.  Reissued by Natural Heritage Books, 1989, .

Awards
The Burroughs Medal, 1969, for The Lovely and the Wild
The Sir Charles G. D. Roberts Special Award, 1969, for The Lovely and the Wild
Francis H. Kortright Outdoor Writing Award, 1980, for To Whom the Wilderness Speaks
Doris Huestis Speirs Award, for outstanding lifetime contributions to Canadian ornithology, from the Society of Canadian Ornithologists, 1991

See also

Archives 
There is a Louise de Kiriline Lawrence fonds at Library and Archives Canada. The archival reference number is R4063.

References

Bibliography

Further reading
De Kiriline Lawrence, Louise. "Why Did You Come to Canada?" Chatelaine, October 1937, 21 & 53.
Mohr, Merilyn. "To Whom the Wilderness Speaks: The remarkable life of Louise de Kiriline Lawrence." Harrowsmith 83, (1989): 72–81.
Nero, Robert W. Woman by the Shore and Other Poems: A Tribute to Louise de Kiriline Lawrence. Toronto: Natural Heritage, 1990.
Miller, Sarah.  The Miracle and Tragedy of the Dionne Quintuplets, New York: Schwartz & Wade Books, 2019.

1894 births
1992 deaths
Canadian people of Swedish descent
John Burroughs Medal recipients
Canadian naturalists
Canadian nature writers
Canadian nurses
Canadian women nurses
Swedish women in World War I
Swedish nurses
Women naturalists
Women science writers
20th-century Canadian women scientists
20th-century Canadian women writers
20th-century Canadian non-fiction writers
Canadian women non-fiction writers
20th-century naturalists